Lieutenant General Ishfaq Nadeem Ahmad (Urdu: اشفاق ندیم احمد; died 24 September 2021) HI(M), was a retired three star rank Pakistan Army general who served as Corps Commander II Corps of the Pakistan Army. He previously served as Chief of General Staff and Director-General of Military Operations. Lieutenant General Ahmad was second on the seniority list (after Chief of General Staff Lt. Gen. Zubair Hayat) in 2016 of being Chief of Army Staff, but then Prime Minister Nawaz Sharif appointed Lt Gen Qamar Javed Bajwa, who was the inspector general training and evaluation at that time, as the army chief.

Early life and education
Ahmad hailed from Neela, Chakwal and was born to Ahmad Khan Qureshi, who was an engineer with Radio Pakistan.

Ahmad received his formal education from the St Mary's Cambridge School in Rawalpindi. Ahmad also attended Staff College Camberley.

Military career
As Lieutenant colonel, Ahmad was involved with the operations directorate for two years. After being promoted to Brigadier rank, Ahmad was appointed the Chief of Staff of I Corps and also served in Waziristan.

He was promoted to the rank of major general in May 2009. During his tenure as a major general, he led Second Battle of Swat as General Officer Commander where he was appointed in August 2009.

As a major general, he was installed as the Director General of Military Operations in 2011 where he served until 2013<ref name="thenews/30nov2013" / and also made the plan for Pakistan Army's campaign Operation Zarb-e-Azb during his tenure as Director General of Military Operations. He was awarded Hilal-i-Imtiaz (Military) in August 2011.

Ahmad was promoted to the rank of Lieutenant General in August 2013. He was appointed the Vice Chief of General Staff and shortly after appointed the Chief of General Staff.

He was appointed the 31st Chief of General Staff in November 2013 shortly after Raheel Sharif took office as the 15th Chief of Army Staff.

Ahmad belonged to 34 Azad Kashmir Regiment where he was installed as Colonel Commandant in April 2014.

Ahmad was posted as II Corps Commander in Multan in April 2015. During his tenure in Multan, he envisioned the Multan Garrison Public Library, and worked hard to turn that dream into a reality. He also led the Mechanised corps.

He was part of JCB-1 (Junior Cadet Battalion, PMA) and then 62-Long Course of Pakistan Military Academy.

Corporate career 
Ahmad later joined Mari Petroleum Company Ltd as Managing Director/CEO on 26 January 2017 until 11 August 2020.

References

2021 deaths
1958 births
Pakistani generals
Recipients of Hilal-i-Imtiaz
People from Chakwal District
Lieutenant generals
Pakistani Muslims
Punjabi people